Percy Adams (12 July 1914 – 1984) was an English footballer who played for Port Vale in the 1930s.

Career
Adams joined Port Vale as an amateur in August 1936, signing as a professional in October of that year. He played one Third Division North match but was unable to gain a regular first team place at The Old Recreation Ground and was instead released in April 1937.

Career statistics
Source:

References

1914 births
1984 deaths
Footballers from Stoke-on-Trent
English footballers
Association football midfielders
Port Vale F.C. players
English Football League players